Istarska may refer to:

Istarska županija, in Croatia
Malvazija Istarska, in Croatia